Ruining Lives is the ninth studio album by American metal band Prong. Released on April 23, 2014, the album was produced by Tommy Victor and Steve Evetts. On April 29, 2014, a lyric video was released for the song "Turnover".

Track listing 
All lyrics written by Tommy Victor.

 "Turnover" (Tommy Victor, Chris Collier)
 "The Barriers" (Victor, Collier)
 "Windows Shut" (Victor, Collier)
 "Remove, Separate Self" (Victor, Collier)
 "Ruining Lives" (Victor, Jason Christopher, Alexei Rodrigues)
 "Absence of Light" (Victor, Collier)
 "The Book of Change" (Victor, Collier)
 "Self Will Run Riot" (Victor, Collier)
 "Come to Realize" (Victor, Collier)
 "Chamber of Thought" (Victor, Collier, Justin Manning)
 "Limitations and Validations" (Victor, Collier)
 "Retreat" (bonus track on digipak and double-vinyl releases) (Victor, Collier)

Personnel

Tommy Victor - vocals, guitars, bass
Chris Collier - drums
Sammy D'Ambruoso - arrangements on "Windows Shut"
Justin Manning - guitar solo on "Chamber of Thought"

Chart performance

References 

2014 albums
Prong (band) albums
Albums produced by Tommy Victor